The Racecourse-class minesweepers were 32 ships delivered to the Royal Navy during the First World War. They were built to two related designs as paddlewheel coastal minesweeping sloops under the Emergency War Programme. The vessels were reasonable sea-boats, but lost speed badly in a seaway when the paddle boxes tended to become choked with water. The class is also widely referred to as the Ascot class and Improved Ascot class.

Initial design
At the start of the First World War, it soon became clear that a large number of minesweepers would be required to keep coastal shipping routes free from naval mines that were laid at night by fast German minelayers. Initially, requisitioned trawlers were used for the task, but they had too deep a draught to operate in some areas, and could be too slow to sever the mooring cables of the mines. Late in 1914, the Admiralty hired a number of paddle steamers which were built to carry tourists to seaside resorts or on pleasure cruises. They were significantly faster than the trawlers and had a shallower draught. Because of their size and simplicity, they could be built in small shipyards without affecting the production of larger warships.

The original design was by the Ailsa Shipbuilding Company. The ships were completed between April and October 1916. Launch dates are shown below.
 : January 1916, Ailsa S.B. Co—first of class, also last ship to be lost in World War I.
 : January 1916, Ailsa S.B. Co. Converted for passenger use in 1929 as PS Queen of Kent. Converted back to minesweeper in 1939.
 : April 1916, Ailsa S.B. Co
 : June 1916, Ardrossan Co
 : April 1916, Ayrshire D.Y. Co
 : April 1916, Ayrshire D.Y. Co
 : June 1916 Ayrshire D.Y. Co
 : September 1916, Ayrshire D.Y. Co
 : May 1916, G. Brown
 : February 1916, Clyde S.B. Co. Originally fitted to carry seaplanes.
 : April 1916, Dundee S.B. Co.
 : June 1916, Dundee S.B. Co.
 : March 1916, Dunlop, Bremner
 : May 1916, Dunlop, Bremner
 : Ferguson Bros. Lost in World War I.
 : April 1916, Fleming & Ferguson
 : Goole Co.—lost in World War I.
 : March 1916, Hamilton. Originally fitted to carry seaplanes. Converted for passenger use in 1929 as PS Queen of Thanet. Converted back to minesweeper in 1940; served at Dunkirk evacuation and Normandy landings.
 : July 1916, A. & J. Inglis
 : McMillan—lost in World War I.
 : June 1916, Murdoch & Murray
 : Ayrshire D.Y. Co.—lost in World War I.
 : July 1916, Dunlop, Bremner
 : May 1916, McMillan

On this type the foremast is stepped before the fore bridges and have derricks abeam of the second funnel.

Improved Racecourse type
These paddle minesweepers were designed by the Admiralty, adapted from the Ailsa Company design for the first type. They were completed between January and June 1918. All were built under the Emergency War Programme.

 : December 1917, Ailsa S.B. Co.
 : February 1918, Ailsa S.B. Co.
 : December 1917, Clyde S.B. Co. 
 : December 1917, Fleming & Ferguson
 : March 1918, Fleming & Ferguson
 : January 1918, Dunlop, Bremner
 : Dunlop, Bremner. Sold as a ferry boat, 1919.
 : March 1918, Murdoch & Murray.
 
The foremast on this type is stepped through the chart house, there are two high ventilators abaft fore funnel and no derricks abeam of the second funnel.

Notes and references

External links 
 The history of HMS Newbury

Mine warfare vessel classes
 
Ship classes of the Royal Navy